Geert Adriaans Boomgaard (21 September 1788; baptized 23 September 1788 – 3 February 1899) was a Dutch supercentenarian and is generally accepted by scholars as the first validated case on record.

Biography

Early life 
Little is known about Boomgaard's life: he was born in Groningen, Netherlands. His parents were Adriaan Jacobs Boomgaard (1763–1844) and Geesje Geerts Bontekoe (1762–1834). His father was captain on a boat, and civil records say that Geert had the same job. In addition to captaining a boat, other sources say that he also served as a soldier in the 33rd Light Infantry Regiment in Napoleon's Grande Armée.

Marriages 
At the age of 29, on 4 March 1818, he married Stijntje Bus (baptized 19 February 1797 – died 24 March 1830). Stijntje died aged 33, a month after the birth of their 8th child. A year later, on 17 March 1831, Boomgaard married Grietje Abels Jonker (baptized 19 May 1793 – 18 May 1864), with whom he had four more children, for a total of 12.

He outlived all his children: his last surviving child, Jansje Hinderika, died at the age of 57 on 24 May 1885.

Longevity 

On 8 January 1897, Boomgaard surpassed the final age of Belgian Pierre Darcourt (108 years and 108 days) to become the oldest man ever, and by 10 April 1898, he was older than the previous titleholder, 109-year-old Swedish woman Kirsti Skagen (1788–1897), therefore making him the oldest ever verified person at that time.

He died at the age of 110 years and 135 days. The first female supercentenarian and his successor was Margaret Ann Neve — who surpassed Adriaans' final age, dying at almost 111 (1792–1903) — although his lifespan as the longest-lived male was not surpassed until 29 October 1966 by John Mosely Turner, who would reach 111 years and nine months (1856–1968).

See also 
 List of Dutch supercentenarians
 List of last surviving veterans of military insurgencies and wars

References 

1788 births
1899 deaths
Dutch military personnel of the Napoleonic Wars
Dutch supercentenarians
Men supercentenarians
Oldest people
People from Groningen (city)